Nelson Vladimir Brito Salvador (born 24 October 1960) is an Ecuadorian football manager and former player.

References

External links

1960 births
Living people
Ecuadorian footballers
C.D. El Nacional footballers
S.D. Quito footballers
C.S.D. Independiente del Valle footballers
Ecuadorian football managers
C.S.D. Independiente del Valle managers
C.D. Olmedo managers
Association footballers not categorized by position